Gary O'Connor, better known as Gary O', is a Canadian rock singer and songwriter. He is best known for the singles "Pay You Back with Interest" and "All the Young Heroes", which were popular in the early 1980s, and for receiving a Juno Award nomination for Most Promising Male Vocalist at the Juno Awards of 1982.  He wrote the 38 Special song, "Back Where You Belong", which reached number 20 on the Billboard Hot 100 charts in 1983.

Biography
The son of jazz musician Billy O'Connor, he was a member of the bands The Synics and The Spasstiks in the 1960s before the latter band changed its name to Cat in 1968. Cat had a popular Canadian hit in 1970 called "We're In This Together", but broke up by 1972 due to creative differences. O'Connor then performed with a Beatles tribute band called Liverpool; the band soon released two singles of original material, garnering some radio airplay with "Dolly". Following a name change to Aerial, they released the album In the Middle of the Night in 1978.  O'Connor wrote the single "Easy Love", which reached #92 on the Canadian charts.  

O'Connor left Aerial after their first album. He subsequently formed the short-lived band Kid Rainbow and became a member of the board of directors of the Toronto Musicians Association. After folding the band, O'Connor adopted the stage name Gary O' and continued as a solo artist. His self-titled debut album was released in 1981 on Capitol Records. The remake of The Hollies' song "Pay You Back With Interest" reached the Billboard Hot 100 Charts, where it peaked at # 70. Also, the singles "I Believe in You" and "All the Young Heroes" would receive a great deal of airplay on both sides of the border.

In 1984, he released his follow-up album Strange Behavior. The first single "Shades of '45", a song about the Enola Gay bombing the Japanese, became a popular hit in Canada, and the follow-up "Get it While You Can" also became a modest hit.

O'Connor has also had some success in writing songs for other artists, including Terri Crawford, 38 Special ("Back Where You Belong", "One Time For Old Times"), Molly Hatchet ("What's It Gonna Take"), Eddie Money ("Maybe Tomorrow"), Kim Stockwood, Billy Newton-Davis and Beverley Mahood.

Discography

Aerial
 1978 - In the Middle of the Night
 1980 - Maneuvres

Gary O'
 1981 - Gary O'''
 1984 - Strange Behavior''

References 

Canadian rock singers
Canadian male singers
Canadian songwriters
Canadian people of Irish descent
Living people
Year of birth missing (living people)
Place of birth missing (living people)